The Welsh Not was a token used by teachers at some schools in Wales in the 19th century to discourage children from speaking Welsh at school, by marking out those who were heard speaking the language. Accounts suggest that its form and the nature of its use could vary from place to place, but the most common form was a piece of wood suspended on a string that was put around the child's neck.  Other terms used historically include Welsh knot, Welsh note, Welsh lump, Welsh stick, Welsh Mark, and Welsh Ticket.

Overview

During the 19th century the primary function of day schools in Wales was the teaching of English. The teaching of English in Welsh schools was generally supported by the Welsh public and parents who saw it as the language of economic advancement. Some schools practised what we would now call total immersion language teaching and banned the use of Welsh in the school and playground to force children to use and become proficient in English. Some of these schools punished children caught speaking Welsh with the Welsh Not. The Welsh Not was brought about by teachers and school organisations, such at the National Society for Promoting Religious Education, rather than government policy, and its use came about via convention rather than law. The Not was used in schools from as early as 1798, throughout the early 1800s, as late as the 1870s. Strong evidence exists of its usage in Carmarthen, Cardigan and Meirionnydd prior to the 1870s.

The Welsh Not came in several  forms and with different names ("Welsh knot", "Welsh note", "Welsh lump", "Welsh stick", "Welsh lead", "", Welsh Mark, Welsh Ticket") and was used in different ways. It was a token typically made of wood often inscribed with the letters 'WN' which might be worn around the neck. Typically, following the start of some prescribed period of  time, a lesson, the school day or the school week, it was given to the first child heard speaking Welsh and would then be successively passed on to the next child heard speaking it. At the end of the period, the child with the token or all children who had held the token, might be punished. The nature of that punishment varies from one account to another; it might have been detention, the writing out of lines, or corporal punishment.

Background

The use of corporal punishment was legal in all schools in the United Kingdom until it was mostly outlawed in 1986; flogging or caning was in widespread use in British schools throughout the 1800s and early 1900s.

Under Henry VIII the Laws in Wales Acts 1535 and 1542 simplified the administration and the law in Wales. English law and norms of administration were to be used, replacing the complex mixture of regional Welsh laws and administration. Public officials had to be able to speak English and English was to be used in the law courts. These two language provisions probably made little difference since English had already replaced French as the language of administration and law in Wales in the late 14th century.
 In practice this meant that courts had to employ translators between Welsh and English. The courts were 'very popular' with the working class possibly because they knew the jury would understand Welsh and the translation was only for the benefit of the lawyers and judges.

The use of English in the law courts inevitably resulted in significant inconvenience to those who could not speak English. It would also have led to the realisation that to get anywhere in a society dominated by England and the English, the ability to speak English would be a key skill.

Martin Johnes, a professor of history at Swansea University, writes that as the Act granted the Welsh equality with the English in law, that the result was "the language actually regained ground in Welsh towns and rural anglicised areas such as the lowlands of Gwent and Glamorgan" and that thus "Welsh remained the language of the land and the people". Furthermore, Johnes writes that the religious turmoil at the time persuaded the state to support, rather than try to extinguish, the Welsh language. In 1546, Brecon man John Prys had published the first Welsh-language book ("In This Book"), a book containing prayers, which, as the Pope disapproved of it, endeared it to the Crown. The result of the 1567 order by the Crown that a Welsh translation of the New Testament be used in every parish church in Wales (to ensure uniformity of worship in the kingdom) was that Welsh would remain the language of religion. Davies says that as the (Tudor) government were to promote Welsh for worship, they had more sympathy for Welsh, than for Irish in Ireland, French in Calais, and than the government of Scotland had for Gaelic of the Highlands. The Tudors themselves were of partly Welsh origin.

Among the common folk of Wales, at the time of the Welsh Not, hostility towards English was widespread. This was compounded by the three-part Reports of the Commissioners of Inquiry into the State of Education in Wales, often referred to as the "Treason of the Blue Books" in Wales; published by the British Government in 1847, which caused uproar in Wales for disparaging the Welsh; being particularly scathing in its view of the nonconformity, the Welsh language. However the inquiry did not lead to any governmental action and the hostile reaction was mainly aimed at the comments about Welsh morality.

Reactions and impact

According to the Encyclopaedia of Wales, "Welsh patriots view the Welsh Not(e) as an instrument of cultural genocide", but "it was welcomed by some parents as a way of ensuring that their children made daily use of English".

The use of the Welsh Not created a stigma in using the Welsh Language. However work from groups such as the Society for the Utilization of the Welsh Language (of 1885) after the passing of the Education Act 1870 tried to fight for the right to speak Welsh and learn through the medium of Welsh in schools, and to advocate bilingualism in classrooms. Although their campaigning resulted in the encouragement of teaching Welsh history and geography within schools, the education system continued to become further dominated by the English system.

In 2012, Conservative MP David TC Davies stated that the British Government had not been responsible for suppressing the Welsh language in the 19th century, saying that the practice took place before government involvement in the education system began with the Education Act 1870, and that "the teachers who imposed the Welsh Not were Welsh and its imposition would have been done with the agreement of parents".

Professor Martin Johnes writes that neither the Welsh Not nor the efforts to prevent the use of the language in schools were official state policies, instead coming down to actions taken by individual teachers; but that the Welsh Not nonetheless remains "a powerful symbol of the oppression of Welsh culture."

In literature 
 Myrddin ap Dafydd (2019). Under the Welsh Not, Llanrwst, Gwasg Carreg Gwalch

See also 
 Dialect card , used to promote standard speech in Japanese schools.
 Symbole, a similar object used in French schools as a means of punishment for students caught speaking regional dialects.

References

Notes

Citations

External links 

Photographs of  Welsh Not artefacts at the National Museum of Wales
Owen Morgan Edwards describes his experience of the Welsh Not in school in Llanuwchllyn in his book .

Linguistic rights
Linguistic discrimination
Not
Not
School punishments
History of Wales